Monyak Hill (‘Halm Monyak’ \'h&lm 'mo-nyak\) is the rocky hill rising to 864 m at the north extremity of Flowers Hills on the east side of Sentinel Range in Ellsworth Mountains, Antarctica.  It surmounts Dater Glacier to the west, Ellen Glacier to the north, and Lardeya Ice Piedmont to the east.

The feature is named after the medieval fortress of Monyak in southern Bulgaria.

Location
US mapping in 1988.

Maps
 Vinson Massif.  Scale 1:250 000 topographic map.  Reston, Virginia: US Geological Survey, 1988.
 Antarctic Digital Database (ADD). Scale 1:250000 topographic map of Antarctica. Scientific Committee on Antarctic Research (SCAR). Since 1993, regularly updated.

Notes

References
 Monyak Hill. SCAR Composite Antarctic Gazetteer.
 Bulgarian Antarctic Gazetteer. Antarctic Place-names Commission. (details in Bulgarian, basic data in English)

External links
 Monyak Hill. Copernix satellite image

Hills of Ellsworth Land
Bulgaria and the Antarctic